Feldberg is a municipality in the district of Breisgau-Hochschwarzwald in Baden-Württemberg in southern Germany. It is located near the Feldberg, the highest summit in Baden-Württemberg. It comprises the settlements of Altglashütten, Neuglashütten, Falkau, Bärental, and Feldberg. At an elevation of 1,277 m, the last is considered the highest village in Germany.

Geography 
The Feldberg municipality has the slogan "The highest in the Black Forest" and is located in the Southern Black Forest Nature Park at the Feldberg Pass. It is located between Wiesental (to the south) and Gutachtal (to the north). The largest section of the municipality is the "Falkau" area, where the town hall is located.

Community structure 
The current Feldberg municipality includes the three former municipalities of Feldberg, Altglashütten, and Falkau and consists of 30 villages, sections, farms, and cottages and houses.

Climate 
Feldberg has a subarctic climate (Dfc) due to its high altitude with short, cool summers and long, cold winters. Precipitation is very high and frequent year round.

History 
The first mention of Feldberg was made in 983, but there was a separate municipality with the same name until January 1, 1939, when isolated pastures were combined with the municipality Bärental (970 m above sea level). They were previously owned by the municipalities Bernau, Brandenberg, Hinterzarten, Menzenschwand, St. William, Todtnau and Zastler. What was left of Brandenberg after incorporation to Feldberg became a new district in Todtnau.

Politics

Local council 

The general election on May 25, 2014 resulted in the following allocation of seats within the local council:

Administration 
There is an inter-municipality agreement with the neighbouring Schluchsee municipality.

Coat of arms
In 1974, the ministry of the interior granted Dr. Alfred Simon permission to design the following crest: a red plate head holding two crossed silver snowshoes lies above a split silver and blue area. The blue section, on the left, holds three silver discs, and the silver section, on the right, holds a green fir tree.

The founder municipalities Feldberg, Bärental, and Altglashütten are represented by the three primary colours red, white, and blue. The blue also most likely represents the connection to the former House of Fürstenberg (Swabia). The meaning of the three discs leaves room for speculation. They are either reminiscent of glass spheres and glaziers or of the three lakes that meet within the boundary of Feldberg: Titisee, Windgfällweiher und Schluchsee. They could also symbolize the unity of the three communities.

Twin towns
Feldberg has a sister city agreement with the municipality of La Clusaz in France im Département Haute-Savoie, which is, like Feldberg, a winter sport centre.

Transport 
Federal highways 500 and 317 intersect in Bärental. The construction of the Dreiseenbahn, which runs from Titisee to Seebrugg, was completed in 1926 and in Bärental, it is Germany's highest railway on a standard gauge track.

Education 
Altglashütten has a primary school and a kindergarten.

Sightseeing

Nature monuments 
The sponsoring association of the Southern Black Forest Nature Park has its seat in Feldberg.

 Feldsee, a tarn excavated by the Feldberg glacier below the summit
 Zastler Loch, formed as the Feldberg glacier excavated valleys in the former village of Zastler
 Bärhalde, a botanically interesting forest summit with rocks and small moors
 Rotmeer, a swampy area
 Seebach waterfall, near the town of Behabühl
 Falkau waterfall in Haslach
 Headwaters of the Wiese, Alb (Upper Rhine), and Wutach rivers

Culture 
The Lawrence of Rome festival occurs yearly on the Feldberg in addition to the nearby annual Altglashütten town festival.

Notable people
 August Euler (1868–1957), pioneer aviator, lived in a house on the Seebuck mountain until his death

Literature
 August Vetter: Feldberg im Schwarzwald, Selbstverlag der Gemeinde Feldberg (Schwarzwald), 1982/1996

References

External links
 Feldberg: pictures 

Breisgau-Hochschwarzwald
Baden